McGary is a surname. Notable people with the surname include:

Austin McGary (1846–1928), American sheriff and evangelist
Ethel McGary (1907–1975), American freestyle swimmer
Hugh McGary (1744–1806), Irish-American pioneer and slave owner
Hugh McGary Jr., American city founder
Kaleb McGary (born 1995), American football player
Mitch McGary (born 1992), American basketball player

See also
McGary, Indiana
McGary Islands